John S. Heermans (June 7, 1790 – February 17, 1865) was a member of the Florida House of Representatives from St. Lucia County in the 1852 session, and after the county changed its name, from Brevard County in the sessions of 1856, 1858, and 1859. He had also served as a county commissioner for St. Lucia County in 1852. He served as a probate judge in 1851, and from 1853 to 1855.

He served on a committee for the defense of the state during the American Civil War.

See also 
 List of members of the Florida House of Representatives from Brevard County, Florida

References 

1790 births
1865 deaths
County commissioners in Florida
Members of the Florida House of Representatives
People from Brevard County, Florida
People from Fort Pierce, Florida
People from Saugerties, New York
Probate court judges in the United States
19th-century American politicians
19th-century American judges